MailSite is a commercial mail server, calendar software, contact manager and collaborative software developed by Rockliffe Systems.  MailSite was one of the first mail servers to run on Windows NT using Internet standards when version 1.2 was released in 1996.  MailSite has been in continual development since 1996 with version 10 released in 2013.  MailSite runs on a single Windows Server or a cluster of Windows Server computers.  MailSite works natively with Microsoft Outlook versions 2007 to 2013 for mail, calendar and contacts without requiring any Outlook plug-ins.  MailSite includes an Exchange ActiveSync (EAS) server for synchronizing mail, calendar and contacts with mobile devices.  MailSite also works with Internet Standards-based mail clients such as Mozilla Thunderbird.

Packages
MailSite is sold in three package configurations for different markets.  MailSite SE is a single-server package for small and medium enterprises.  MailSite LE is a multi-server package for large enterprises.  MailSite SP provides advanced multi-server clustering for service providers, hosting companies, internet service providers and telecommunication companies.

Features
MailSite provides a comprehensive set of features:
 Mail, calendar and contact server that works with Microsoft Outlook versions 2007 to 2013 without plug-ins
 Exchange ActiveSync (EAS) server for synchronization of mail, calendar and contacts with mobile devices
 Shared calendar server that works with Microsoft Outlook, Google Calendar, Apple iCal and Mozilla Sunbird
 Customizable AJAX Web Client that works with Internet Explorer, Mozilla Firefox, Apple Safari, Google Chrome and Opera
 Mail list server for sending email to lists of addresses
 Built-in two-tier data-less clustering that scales to over a million mailboxes (MailSite SP and MailSite LE only)
 Extensive messaging security including:
 SSL and TLS encrypted connections
 Authenticated SMTP
 Real-time Blacklist lookup (RBL)
 Reverse-DNS lookup (RDNS)
 Directory Harvest Attack Protection (DHAP)
 Compromised Account Detection (CAD)
 DomainKeys Identified Mail (DKIM)
 Optional anti-spam protection including:
 Domain & IP reputation checking
 Greylisting
 White list and black list
 Optional anti-virus protection
 MIME-aware SIEVE content filtering
 Web administration console
 Windows administration console

Supported clients

Groupware

MailSite provides native support for mail, calendar and contact sync for these clients:
 ExpressPro, web-based email utilizing AJAX, which works with
 Internet Explorer
 Mozilla Firefox
 Apple Safari
 Google Chrome
 Microsoft Outlook 2007 to 2013 natively without any plug-ins or connectors
 Apple iPhone
 Apple iPad
 Android Phones and Tablets
 Windows Mobile
 Windows Phone
 Palm Treo
 Symbian with Nokia Mail For Exchange
 BlackBerry OS 5 to 7 with AstraSync
 BlackBerry 10

Mail only
 Microsoft Outlook for Mac 2011
 Apple Mail on Mac OS X
 Mozilla Thunderbird
 Microsoft Outlook Express

Release History

Awards
Windows IT Pro Reader's Choice Awards 2002: Best Mail Server
Windows IT Pro Reader's Choice Awards 2006:  Best Mail Server

References

External links
 Official MailSite homepage
 Rockliffe Systems Website
 MailSite Fusion Tested and Verified for Use with Google Android Devices
 MailSite Collaborator 8
 MailSite Fusion Messaging Server Tested And Verified For Use With Apple iPad
 MailSite Serves Email, Calendar and Contacts To Outlook 2007 Without Plug-ins
 Rockliffe: Nice Example of Inexpensive, Easy Push Mobile Messaging
 Microsoft ActiveSync the Future of Mobile Phone Synchronization?
 BlackBerry Support Expensive for Hosted Exchange
 MailSite -- Powerful Windows NT mail server with SQL and ODBC database integration
 The Evolution of Mailsite
 Rockliffe Rolls Out MailSite Version 6
 MailSite Mobile Messaging Unites Workers
 MailSite Sets Sights on E-Mail Needs, Large and Small
 MailSite Fusion 9 vetted for iPhone use
 MailSite – Another BES/Exchange Replacement Using Activesync
 Radicati Reports about MailSite

Groupware
Message transfer agents
MacOS Internet software
Windows Internet software